The Medal for Gallantry (MG) is a military decoration awarded to personnel of the Australian Defence Force. It recognises acts of gallantry in action in hazardous circumstances. The MG was introduced on 15 January 1991, replacing the Imperial equivalent. It is ranked third in the Gallantry Decorations in the Australian Honours System. Recipients of the Medal of Gallantry are entitled to use the post-nominal letters "MG".

Description
 The Medal for Gallantry is circular and is made of gold-plated silver. It is ensigned with the Crown of Saint Edward. The obverse bears a Federation Star, which is superimposed on a circle of flames. This image represents action under fire.
 The reverse shows a horizontal panel superimposed on a design of fluted rays.
 The Medal for Gallantry is suspended from a 32 millimetre-wide ribbon by a narrow gold-plated silver suspender bar. The ribbon has a design of chevrons of light orange alternating with chevrons of deep orange angled at 60 degrees. The chevron pattern is placed as a stylised "A" with the points facing upwards.

Decoration allowance
Veterans who are paid disability pension under the Veterans Entitlements Act 1986 (the Act), and who have been awarded a gallantry award specified in the Act, including the Medal for Gallantry, are also paid a decoration allowance. In May 2011, the allowance was A$2.10 per fortnight.

Notable recipients

 Signalman Martin "Jock" Wallace MG, formerly of the 152 Signal Squadron and the Special Air Service Regiment. Awarded 27 November 2002 for actions in Afghanistan on 2 March 2002.
 Sergeant "C" (Matthew Locke MG of the Special Air Service Regiment) was subsequently killed in action in 2007.
 Lance Corporal "E" is now known as Corporal Ben Roberts-Smith VC MG of the Special Air Service Regiment. He was awarded the MG for actions in the period May–September 2006 in Afghanistan, and subsequently the VC. 
 Corporal "B", (later identified as Sergeant Brett Wood MG), of the 2nd Commando Regiment was subsequently killed in action on 23 May 2011.

List of recipients

Number awarded

In March 2018, only 55 of the recipients were listed on the "It's an Honour" website. A further 8 recipients have been identified from official publications of the Governor General, the Department of Defence and from special issues of the Australian Government Gazette.

Many of the awards have been presented at the official Australia Day ceremonies - held on 26 January - and Queen's Birthday ceremonies - held on the 2nd Monday in June.

See also
 Australian Honours Order of Precedence

References

External links
It's an Honour

Military awards and decorations of Australia
Courage awards

1991 establishments in Australia
Awards established in 1991